Pedamadduru is a village in Palnadu district of the Indian state of Andhra Pradesh. It is located in Amaravathi mandal of Guntur revenue division. The village forms a part of Andhra Pradesh Capital Region, under the jurisdiction of APCRDA.

Geography 

Demographics 

 Census of India, Pedamadduru had a population of 1,400. The total population constitute, 699 males and 701 females  a sex ratio of 1002 females per 1000 males. 146 children are in the age group of 0–6 years, with child sex ratio of 1393 girls per 1000 boys. The average literacy rate stands at 57.65% with 794 literates.

Government and politics 

Pedda Madduru Gram Panchayat is the local self-government of the village. There are wards, each represented by an elected ward member. The present sarpanch is vacant, elected by the ward members. The village is administered by the  Amaravathi Mandal Parishad at the intermediate level of panchayat raj institutions.

Education 

As per the school information report for the academic year 2018–19, the village has only one MPP school.

Podile Narasimharao upper primary school, pedamadduru.

Transport 

APSRTC runs buses from Vijayawada, Amaravathi and Mangalagiri.

References 

Villages in Palnadu district